Kuoppamäki is a Finnish surname that may refer to
Jukka Kuoppamäki (born 1942), Finnish singer, songwriter and priest 
Liisa Mustonen (Kuoppamäki, born 1969), Finnish film actress, former wife of Sami
Sami Kuoppamäki (born 1971), Finnish drummer

Finnish-language surnames